Kyrgyzstan has appeared in seven Summer Games and seven Winter Games as an independent state and has won 7 medals. It was previously represented by the Soviet Union team. In 1992, Kyrgyzstan competed as a part of the Unified Team, following the break up of the Soviet Union. Kyrgyzstan made its first appearance as an independent nation in the 1994 Winter Olympics and the 1996 Summer Olympics.

Medal tables

Medals by Summer Games

Medals by Winter Games

Medals by sport

List of medalists

Disqualified Medalists

See also
 List of flag bearers for Kyrgyzstan at the Olympics

External links